MacRae or Macrae may refer to:

People

Surname

Alexander MacRae (c. 1888–1938), Australian entrepreneur and clothing manufacturer
Alistair Macrae (b. 1957), Australian clergyman
Allan MacRae (1902–1997), American theologian
Andrew MacRae (soccer) (born 1990), Canadian soccer player
Angus MacRae (b.1967) Moderator of the General Assembly of the Free Church of Scotland 2018
Bill Macrae, British musician
Calum MacRae (b. 1980), rugby union coach
Callum Macrae, Scottish journalist and film maker
Danny MacRae, Scottish shinty player
Dave MacRae (b. 1940), New Zealand keyboardist 
Donald MacRae (1916–2006), Canadian astronomer
Donnchadh MacRath, also known as Duncan MacRae of Inverinate, 17th-century poet
Duncan Macrae (rugby union) (1914–2007) Scottish rugby union player
Duncan MacRae (rugby league) (1934–2019), New Zealand rugby league player
Duncan Macrae (actor) (1905–1967), Scottish actor and comedian
Ebenezer James MacRae (1881–1951), Scottish architect
Elizabeth MacRae (b. 1936), American actress
Emma Fordyce MacRae (1887–1974), American painter
Finlay MacRae (b. 1986), Scottish shinty player
George W. MacRae, Florida Supreme Court Justice
Gordon MacRae (1921–1986), American actor and singer
Heather MacRae (b. 1946), American actress
Helen MacRae (active 1909–1914), British suffragette
Henry MacRae (1876–1944), Canadian film director, producer and screenwriter
Jade MacRae, Australian soul singer
James Macrae (1677–1744), Governor of Madras 1725–1730
James Macrae (botanist) (died 1830), Botanist aboard the Voyage of the H.M.S. Blonde (1824–25)
John Chester MacRae (1912–1997), Canadian teacher, soldier and politician
John David MacRae (1876–1967), Canadian politician
John MacRae-Gilstrap (1861–1937), British soldier who restored Eilean Donan Castle 
Josh Macrae, British drummer and record producer 
Keith MacRae (b. 1951), Scottish footballer
Leah MacRae, Scottish actress
Margaret Macrae, New Zealand swimmer
Meredith MacRae (1944–2000), American actress
Mike MacRae, American comedian and voice actor
Neil MacRae (b. 1972) Scottish cricketer 
Norman Macrae (1923–2010), British economist and writer 
Renee MacRae (b. 1940), Scottish woman who disappeared in 1976
Scott MacRae (b. 1974), American Major League Baseball player 
Sheila MacRae, English television actress
Stuart Macrae (footballer) (1855–1927), English international footballer
Stuart MacRae (composer) (b. 1976), Scottish composer
Stuart Macrae (inventor), British inventor and Army officer
Tom MacRae, British television writer
William MacRae (1834–1882), officer in the Confederate States Army 
Willie McRae (1923–1985), Scottish nationalist best remembered for the mystery surrounding his death
Peter Francis-Macrae (b. 1982), English spammer

Given name

James Macrae Aitken (1908–1983), Scottish chess player
Colin Macrae Ingersoll (1819–1903), U.S. Representative from Connecticut

Other uses

Clan MacRae, a Scottish clan
LeBoeuf, Lamb, Greene & MacRae, a law firm
MV Empire MacRae, a grain ship
John Macrae Books, an imprint of Henry Holt and Company

See also
McRae (disambiguation)
McCrae (disambiguation)
McCrea (disambiguation)

Scottish surnames